The HESA Yasin is an Iranian training jet which was unveiled on October 17, 2019. The jet is tasked for CAS support.

The aircraft has been designed and built by Iranian Armed Forces specialists and is purposed to be utilized for training fighter pilots.

History
The Yasin was unveiled during a ceremony in Shahid Noje Airbase in Hamadan Province on October 17, 2019, that was by the attendance of high-ranking Iranian officials among Iranian Defense Minister Brigadier General, Amir Hatami, Iran's Air Force Brigadier General commander Aziz Nasirzadeh and vice-president for science/technology affairs Sorena Sattari.

The mass production of the standard version started on 11 March 2023.

Design
The weight of Yasin is 5.5 tons and is able to fly up to 1200 kilometers. The wing's design enables the jet to land and take-off at a speed of at least 200 km/h.

The length of this aircraft is 12 meter and its height is 4 meters.

Arming Yasin trainer jets for Close Air Support is being considered.

Specifications

References

Yasin
Twinjets
Low-wing aircraft
2010s Iranian military trainer aircraft
Islamic Republic of Iran Air Force
Multi-role aircraft